Eduard Zeis (1 October 1807 – 28 June 1868) was a German surgeon and ophthalmologist born in Dresden.

He studied medicine at the Universities of Leipzig, Bonn and Munich, receiving his doctorate at Leipzig in 1832. Afterwards he opened a general practice in his hometown of Dresden, later becoming a professor of surgery at the University of Marburg (1844). In 1850 he returned to Dresden and was senior medical officer at the newly founded city hospital in Dresden-Friedrichstadt.

In 1838 he published the first textbook of plastic surgery, "Handbuch der plastischen Chirurgie", of which he established the term "plastische chirurgie" (plastic surgery). Its foreword was written by famed surgeon Johann Friedrich Dieffenbach (1792-1847), and the textbook has since been translated into English. In 1838 Zeis published a study involving dreams of the blind.

His name is associated with the eponymous "glands of Zeis", described as sebaceous glands that open into the follicles of the eyelashes, as well as to "Zeisian sty", which is an inflammation of one of Zeis' glands.

Selected works 
 Handbuch der plastischen Chirurgie, 1838.
 Abhandlungen aus dem Gebiete der Chirurgie, 1845.
 Beiträge zur pathologischen Anatomie und zur Pathologie des Hüftgelenkes, 1851.
 Die Literatur und Geschichte der plastischen Chirurgie, 1863.
 Nachträge zur Literatur und Geschichte der plastischen Chirurgie, 1864.
 "The Zeis Index and History of Plastic Surgery, 900 B.C.-1863 A.D."; Williams and Wilkins, 1977 - 315 pages.
 "Zeis' Manual of Plastic Surgery"; Oxford University Press, 1988 - 225 pages.

References 
 "Parts of this article are based on a translation of an equivalent article at the Dutch Wikipedia".
 Amazon.com  Manual of Plastic Surgery

German surgeons
German ophthalmologists
Physicians from Dresden
Academic staff of the University of Marburg
Leipzig University alumni
1807 births
1868 deaths